Robert Adam Philips Haldane Haldane-Duncan, 3rd Earl of Camperdown (28 May 1841 – 5 June 1918), styled Viscount Duncan from 1859 to 1867, was a British Liberal politician.

Biography
Camperdown was the eldest son of Adam Haldane-Duncan, 2nd Earl of Camperdown, and his wife Juliana (née Philips), and was educated at Eton and Balliol College, Oxford. He succeeded his father in the earldom in 1867 and took his seat on the Liberal benches in the House of Lords. The following year he was appointed a Lord-in-waiting (government whip in the House of Lords) in William Ewart Gladstone's first administration, a post he held until 1870, and then served as a Civil Lord of the Admiralty from 1870 to 1874.

Lord Camperdown received an honorary doctorate (LL.D.) from the University of St Andrews in February 1902. The previous year he had become President of University College, Dundee, then a college of St Andrews. He remained president of the college until his death.

Lord Camperdown died in June 1918, aged 77. He never married and was succeeded in the earldom by his younger brother George.

Notes

References

External links
 

1841 births
1918 deaths
British people of Scottish descent
Earls in the Peerage of the United Kingdom
People educated at Eton College
Alumni of Balliol College, Oxford
People associated with the University of Dundee
Lords of the Admiralty